Erected in 1930, the Sugar House Monument has long stood as a testament to the hard work of early Salt Lake pioneers making the valley sustainable.

In 1855, city leaders and early Mormon settlers sought to create the first factory in the western United States to process beets into refined sugar. They decided to purchase the machinery needed for a newly invented process to produce sugar from sugar beets. A mill was built in downtown Sugar House to house the machinery. The process was a failure and in the summer of 1855, Brigham Young ordered the mill to shut down. The old sugar mill building was then converted to a paper factory in 1860, then a bucket factory and finally a machine shop for the Utah Central Railroad until 1928. Despite the failed sugar mill, Sugar House prospered as Salt Lake's second downtown thanks to local merchants and a bustling streetcar system.

In the 1920s, sculptor Millard F. Malin pitched the idea of erecting a monument in honor of early manufacturing to the Sugar House Business Men's League. The league and the city of Salt Lake jointly funded the $2,000 monument sculpted by Malin and his two fellow artists; Edward Anderson and Lorenzo Young. The monument was completed and dedicated on November 11, 1934. The obelisk stands approximately 200 feet east of the original site of a Mormon Pioneer sugar mill.

Malin describes the monument as: 

The plaque reads "May the spirit of this courageous venture continue to characterize this community".

It was listed on the National Register of Historic Places in 2003.

See also

 National Register of Historic Places listings in Salt Lake City

References

External links

 Sugar House SLC
 Salt Lake Public Art

Art Deco architecture in Utah
Buildings and structures completed in 1930
Buildings and structures in Salt Lake City
Monuments and memorials in Utah
Monuments and memorials on the National Register of Historic Places in Utah
National Register of Historic Places in Salt Lake City
Outdoor sculptures in Salt Lake City
Sculptures of men in Utah
Statues in Utah